Ryleigh Buck (born January 19, 1998) is an American softball and baseball player. She is a member of the United States women's national baseball team which won a gold medal at the 2015 Pan American Games.

Biography 
Ryleigh Buck was born in McPherson, Kansas on January 19, 1998. She attended Wellington High School in Wellington, Kansas.

Buck signed her national letter of intent to play softball at the University of Central Florida. After one semester she transferred to play softball at Wichita State University. She played softball for the Wichita-based Mustangs organization. She competed for the United States women's national baseball team at the Women's baseball tournament of the 2015 Pan American Games.

References

External links 
 Ryleigh Buck on Team USA

People from McPherson, Kansas
American female baseball players
Baseball infielders
Baseball players from Kansas
Softball players from Kansas
1998 births
Living people
Baseball players at the 2015 Pan American Games
University of Central Florida alumni
Pan American Games gold medalists for the United States
Pan American Games medalists in baseball
People from Wellington, Kansas
Wichita State Shockers softball players
Medalists at the 2015 Pan American Games